The Chu–Han Contention or Chu–Han War was an interregnum period in ancient China between the fallen Qin dynasty and the subsequent Han dynasty.  After the third and last Qin ruler, Ziying, unconditionally surrendered to rebel forces in 206 BCE, the former Qin Empire was divided by rebel leader Xiang Yu into the Eighteen Kingdoms, which were ruled by various rebel leaders and surrendered Qin generals. A civil war soon broke out, most prominently between two major contending powers – Xiang Yu's Western Chu and Liu Bang's Han. Some of the other kingdoms also waged war among themselves but these were largely insignificant compared to the main conflict between Chu and Han. The war ended in 202 BCE with a total Han victory at the Battle of Gaixia, where Xiang Yu fled to Wujiang and committed suicide after a violent last stand. Liu Bang subsequently proclaimed himself Emperor and established the Han dynasty as the ruling dynasty of China.

Background

In 221 BCE, the Qin state conquered the other six major states and unified China under the rule of the Qin dynasty. After Qin Shi Huang, the first Qin emperor, died in 210 BCE, an uprising broke out in 209 BCE and lasted about five months before Qin forces defeated the rebels.

Although the uprising was crushed, several other rebellions erupted consecutively over the next three years. Numerous restorationists and pretenders of the six former states emerged. Among them, the most powerful one was Chu. Xiang Yu, a young Chu nobleman and rebel general, scored a major victory over the Qin army at the Battle of Julu and declared himself "Hegemon-King of Western Chu" even though he still paid nominal allegiance to King Huai II, the figurehead ruler of Chu. Xiang Yu controlled nine commanderies in the former Liang and Chu territories, with his capital at Pengcheng (present-day Xuzhou, Jiangsu).

While the Qin army was fighting Chu forces at the Battle of Julu, another rebel force led by Liu Bang advanced into the Guanzhong region, the heartland of Qin, and faced minimal resistance from Qin forces along the way. In 206 BCE, the last Qin emperor, Ziying, surrendered the capital Xianyang to Liu Bang, thus bringing an end to the Qin dynasty. Liu Bang treated Ziying respectfully and forbade his followers from harming civilians and looting the city when they occupied it. However, he was pressured into ceding the control of Guanzhong region over to Xiang Yu when the latter arrived, despite the earlier promise by King Huai that the first to invade Guanzhong would rightfully own it as fief. After Xiang seized control of the city Xianyang allowed his troops to pillage and plunder the former Qin capital, and even ordered the Epang Palace to be burnt down. He also tried to assassinate Liu Bang at the Feast of Hong Gate (who only narrowly escaped due to Xiang's indecisiveness), and later forced Liu to relocate to the remote and underdeveloped Bashu region (present-day Chongqing and Sichuan).

Xiang Yu then divided the former Qin Empire into numerous vassal states, each ruled by either a rebel leader or a surrendered Qin general. The states were collectively known as the Eighteen Kingdoms, with the Kingdom of Chu as the nominal sovereign power over the other kingdoms. Xiang Yu also honoured King Huai II with a higher title, "Emperor Yi of Chu". Shortly after that, he had the figurehead emperor exiled to Chen County (present-day Chenzhou, Hunan), and secretly ordered Ying Bu, the King of Jiujiang, to intercept and assassinate Emperor Yi along the way.

Initial stages 
In 206 BCE, after the former Qin Empire was divided into the Eighteen Kingdoms, Liu Bang was made King of Han and relocated to the Bashu region (present-day Chongqing and Sichuan) along with 30,000 troops and thousands of civilians. Upon reaching his destination, Liu Bang ordered the destruction of the gallery roads leading into Bashu in order to trick Xiang Yu into believing that he had no intention of leaving Bashu, and as a precautionary move against any attack from outside Bashu.

Rebellions in Qi and Zhao 
Meanwhile, in the former Qi state, Tian Rong, a Qi noble, was unhappy with how the Qi territories had been split among three kingdoms – Qi, Jiaodong and Jibei (collectively known as the Three Qis) – so he waged war against the other kingdoms. He killed Tian Shi, the King of Jiaodong, and Tian An, the King of Jibei. Tian Du, the King of Qi, lost to Tian Rong so he fled and joined Xiang Yu. Tian Rong gained control of the Three Qis and became the new king of the Qi territories.

Tian Rong put Peng Yue in command of the Qi army and sent him to attack Xiang Yu. At the same time, he sent troops to support Chen Yu in a rebellion in the former Zhao state. In 205 BCE, Chen Yu defeated Zhang Er, the King of Changshan, and seized control of his kingdom. Chen Yu then installed Zhao Xie, the King of Dai, as the new ruler of the Zhao territories.

Xiang Yu felt threatened by the rebellions in Qi and Zhao so he led his forces to attack Tian Rong.

Han conquest of the Three Qins 

While Xiang Yu was away suppressing the rebellions in Qi and Zhao, Liu Bang seized the opportunity to attack the territories ruled by three former Qin generals which were collectively known as the Three Qins. He ordered his general Han Xin to pretend to repair the gallery roads leading from Bashu to the Three Qins in order to put the enemy off guard, while secretly taking another route through Chencang (present-day Chencang District, Baoji, Shaanxi) to get to the Three Qins. Han Xin took Zhang Han, the King of Yong, by surprise and defeated him in two consecutive battles.

Riding on the tide of victory, Liu Bang proceeded to conquer Longxi (the area in present-day Gansu located west of Mount Long), Beidi (eastern Gansu and Ningxia) and Shangjun (around present-day Yulin, Shaanxi). He also sent his men to fetch his family in Pei (in present-day Xuzhou, Jiangsu). Upon receiving news of Liu Bang's attacks, Xiang Yu sent an army to Yangjia (present-day Taikang County, Henan) to block Liu Bang's forces, and appointed Zheng Chang as the King of Hán to help him cover his flank.

In the meantime, Zang Tu, the King of Yan, killed Han Guang, the King of Liaodong, seized his lands and proclaimed himself the ruler of the Yan territories.

Battle of Pengcheng 

In 205 BCE, after conquering the Guanzhong region, Liu Bang advanced to the east of Hangu Pass to prepare for an attack on the Henan region. Sima Xin, the King of Sai, Dong Yi, the King of Di, and Shen Yang, the King of Henan, surrendered to Liu Bang. Zheng Chang, the King of Hán, refused to submit to Liu Bang so Liu Bang sent Hán Xin to attack and defeat him. Liu Bang then replaced Zheng Chang with Hán Xin as the new King of Hán. Zhang Er, the former King of Changshan, joined Liu Bang after losing his domain to Zhao Xie and Chen Yu.

In the third lunar month of 205 BCE, Liu Bang attacked Henei with help from Wei Bao, the King of Western Wei. When Liu Bang received news that Xiang Yu had ordered the assassination of Emperor Yi, the nominal sovereign over the Eighteen Kingdoms, he held a memorial service for the emperor and accused Xiang Yu of committing regicide, using this incident as political propaganda to justify his war against Xiang Yu.

In the fourth lunar month of 205 BCE, Xiang Yu defeated Tian Rong at Chengyang (around present-day Ju County, Shandong). Tian Rong was killed while retreating to Pingyuan (around present-day northwestern Shandong). Although the Kingdom of Qi had surrendered, Xiang Yu still allowed his troops to plunder and loot the Qi territories. Tian Rong's younger brother, Tian Heng, made Tian Guang, Tian Rong's son, the new King of Qi, and continued to put up resistance against Xiang Yu.

Meanwhile, Liu Bang had mustered an army of about 560,000 with support from the kings who surrendered to him. In the eighth lunar month of 205 BCE, the Chu capital, Pengcheng (彭城; present-day Xuzhou, Jiangsu), fell to a coalition force led by Liu Bang. When Xiang Yu received news that Liu Bang had occupied Pengcheng, he led 30,000 troops to retake Pengcheng. Liu Bang was caught off guard and his army suffered heavy casualties and his family members were captured by Chu forces. After the battle, Liu Bang lost his territorial gains in Chu and the support of his allies.

Battle of Jingsuo 
After their defeat at Pengcheng, the strength of the Han forces decreased drastically. Liu Bang's family members were captured by Chu forces and kept as hostages. Many of the kings who had surrendered to Liu Bang earlier defected to Xiang Yu's side after Liu Bang's defeat. Moreover, the Qi and Zhao kingdoms, which were previously at war with Chu, also requested to make peace with Chu.

Upon reaching Xiayi (east of present-day Dangshan County, Anhui), which was guarded by his brother-in-law, Liu Bang reorganised his troops for a retreat. Meanwhile, Han Xin led reinforcements from Guanzhong into the Central Plain and attacked and defeated a Chu army between Jing County and Suo Village, both in present-day Henan. He also put down a rebellion by Wang Wu and Cheng Chu - former Qin commanders - and Shen Tu, the magistrate of Wei, capturing their base, the city of Waihuang. He and Liu Bang reorganized the Han army and established strong Han garrisons in the cities of Xingyang and Chenggao in the Central Plain. Han Xin also developed his plan to conquer northern China, with the aim that Xiang Yu would be too distracted by Liu Bang and his bases of Xingyang and Chenggao to properly counter Han Xin in the north, nor could he endanger his line of retreat by marching past Xingyang and Chenggao into Guanzhong.

Liu Bang then sent a messenger to meet Ying Bu, the King of Jiujiang, to persuade Ying Bu to support him. In November, after Han Xin's victory in the battle of Jingxing (see below), Ying Bu agreed to join Liu Bang and rebelled against Xiang Yu. Upon learning about it, Xiang Yu sent Long Ju to attack Ying Bu.

In the sixth lunar month of 205 BCE, Liu Bang named his son Liu Ying as his heir apparent and put him in charge of Yueyang (present-day Yanliang District, Xi'an, Shaanxi). Shortly after, Han forces conquered Feiqiu (present-day Xingping, Shaanxi), which was guarded by Zhang Han, who committed suicide after his defeat.

On another front, Ying Bu was unable to resist Long Ju's attacks so he gave up on his domain in Jiujiang and joined Liu Bang.

Northern front

Battle of Anyi 

In 205 BCE, Wei Bao, the King of Western Wei, left Liu Bang on the pretext of visiting an ill relative and secretly returned to his domain. He pledged allegiance to Xiang Yu and rebelled against Liu Bang. Liu Bang sent Li Yiji to persuade Wei Bao to surrender but Wei Bao refused, so Liu Bang ordered Han Xin to attack Wei Bao.

Wei Bao stationed his army at Puban (present-day Yongji, Shanxi) and blocked the route to Linjin (present-day Dali County, Shaanxi). Han Xin tricked Wei Bao into believing that he was planning to attack Linjin, while secretly sending a force from Xiayang (present-day Hancheng, Shaanxi) to cross the river and attack Anyi (present-day Xia County, Shanxi).

In the ninth lunar month of 205 BCE, Wei Bao personally led an attack on Han Xin but lost the battle and was captured. When he surrendered, Liu Bang accepted his surrender and appointed him as a general. Within the same month, Han Xin attacked the Kingdom of Dai with support from Zhang Er, the former King of Changshan, scored a decisive victory against Dai, and captured Xia Shuo, the Dai chancellor.

Battle of Jingxing 

After achieving victory over the Kingdom of Dai, Han Xin and Zhang Er attacked the Kingdom of Zhao at Jingxing Pass. Zhao Xie, the King of Zhao, and his chancellor, Chen Yu, led an army of 200,000 to resist the Han forces. The Zhao general Li Zuoche proposed a plan to trap Han Xin within 10 days: he would lead 30,000 men to disrupt Han Xin's supply route and block his return route, while Chen Yu would defend the frontline firmly and prevent Han Xin from advancing. Chen Yu refused to implement Li Zuoche's plan.

The evening before the battle, Han Xin sent 2,000 horsemen, each carrying a flag of the Han army, to station near the Zhao camp. The next morning, Han Xin feigned defeat in a skirmish with Zhao forces and lured them to follow him, while his 2,000 men took advantage of the situation to capture the weakly defended Zhao camp. Meanwhile, the Zhao soldiers retreated after failing to conquer Han Xin's fort, and were surprised to see that their camp had been occupied by Han forces when they returned. The Zhao army fell into chaos and Han Xin seized the opportunity to launch a counterattack and scored a victory. Chen Yu was killed in action while Zhao Xie and Li Zuoche were captured.

Battle of Wei River 

In 204 BCE, after the Kingdom of Yan surrendered to him, Liu Bang made Zhang Er the new King of Zhao. Xiang Yu constantly sent his armies to attack the Kingdom of Zhao, but Han Xin and Zhang Er managed to hold their ground. Xiang Yu then turned his attention towards Xingyang, where Liu Bang was stationed. Liu Bang was forced to retreat to Chenggao, but he eventually abandoned Chenggao and headed north of the Yellow River to where Han Xin was. In a surprise move, Liu Bang seized control over the troops under Han Xin's command and ordered Han Xin to attack the Kingdom of Qi.

Just as Han Xin was preparing to attack Qi, Liu Bang sent Li Yiji to persuade Tian Guang, the King of Qi, to surrender. He did not inform Han Xin of this. Tian Guang decided to surrender so he ordered to withdraw from Lixia (present-day Jinan, Shandong). However, as Han Xin did not know that Tian Guang had the intention of surrendering, he followed Kuai Tong's advice and launched an attack on Qi. Han Xin conquered Lixia and attacked the Qi capital, Linzi. Tian Guang thought that Li Yiji had lied to him so he had Li Yiji boiled alive. Then, he retreated to Gaomi and requested aid from Xiang Yu. In the meantime, Han Xin conquered Linzi and continued to pursue the retreating Qi forces to Gaomi.

Xiang Yu sent Long Ju to lead 200,000 troops to help Tian Guang. Long Ju and Tian Guang lost to Han Xin in the first battle. Someone advised Long Ju to avoid engaging Han Xin directly and focus on strengthening their defences, while asking Tian Guang to rally support from the fallen Qi cities. In that case, Han Xin's army would eventually be deprived of supplies and be forced to surrender. However, Long Ju rejected the plan and insisted on attacking Han Xin. On the night before the battle, Han Xin sent his men to dam the Wei River (in present-day Weifang, Shandong) with sandbags.

The next morning, after a skirmish with Chu forces, Han Xin feigned defeat and retreated to lure the enemy to follow him. When about a quarter of the Chu army had crossed the river, Han Xin signalled to his men to open the dam. Many Chu soldiers drowned and Long Ju was isolated with only a fraction of his forces. Taking advantage of the situation, Han Xin launched a counterattack. Long Ju was killed in action and the rest of the Chu army disintegrated as Han Xin continued pressing the attack. Tian Guang fled. Han Xin pursued the retreating enemy forces to Chengyang (around present-day Ju County, Shandong).

After his victory, Han Xin swiftly took control of the Qi territories and then sent a messenger to Liu Bang, requesting that Liu Bang make him the new King of Qi. At the time, Liu Bang was under attack by Xiang Yu in Xingyang and was eagerly awaiting reinforcements from Han Xin. He was furious when he received Han Xin's request. However, he eventually acted on the advice of Zhang Liang and Chen Ping, and reluctantly approved Han Xin's request. At the same time, Xiang Yu felt worried after losing Long Ju, so he sent Wu She to attempt to persuade Han Xin to rebel against Liu Bang and declare himself king. However, despite Kuai Tong's urging, Han Xin refused to betray Liu Bang. Han Xin later organised an army to move southward and attack Xiang Yu.

Battle of Chenggao and the Treaty of Hong Canal
On the southern front, Liu Bang's forces started building supply routes from Xingyang to Aocang (northwest of Xingyang, Henan). In 204 BCE, after sustaining losses from Chu attacks on the routes, the Han army ran short of supplies. Liu Bang negotiated for peace with Xiang Yu and agreed to cede the lands east of Xingyang to Xiang Yu. Xiang Yu wanted to accept Liu Bang's offer, but Fan Zeng advised him to reject and use the opportunity to destroy Liu Bang. Xiang Yu changed his mind, pressed the attack on Xingyang and besieged Liu Bang's forces inside the city. Liu Bang heeded Chen Ping's suggestion to bribe Xiang Yu's men with 40,000 catties of gold for them to spread rumours that Fan Zeng had the intention of betraying Xiang Yu. Xiang Yu fell for the ruse and dismissed Fan Zeng.

In late 204 BCE, while Xiang Yu was away suppressing the rebellion in the Kingdom of Qi, Li Yiji had advised Liu Bang to use the opportunity to attack Xiang Yu. Han forces conquered Chenggao and defeated the Chu army led by Cao Jiu near the Si River. Liu Bang's forces advanced further until they reached Guangwu (present-day Guangwu Town, Xingyang, Henan). Chu forces led by Zhongli Mo were trapped by the Han army at the east of Xingyang. Following Han Xin's victory in the Battle of Wei River, the Chu army's morale fell and it ran short of supplies months later. Xiang Yu had no choice but to request to make peace with Liu Bang and release Liu Bang's family members, who were held hostage by him. Xiang Yu and Liu Bang agreed to a ceasefire at the Treaty of Hong Canal, which divided China into east and west under the Chu and Han domains respectively.

End of the war 
In 203 BCE, while Xiang Yu was retreating eastward, Liu Bang, acting on the advice of Zhang Liang and Chen Ping, renounced the Treaty of Hong Canal and ordered an attack on Xiang Yu. He also requested assistance from Han Xin and Peng Yue to attack Xiang Yu simultaneously from three directions. However, as Han Xin and Peng Yue did not mobilise their troops, Liu Bang was defeated by Xiang Yu at Guling (south of present-day Taikang County, Henan). He retreated and reinforced his defences. At the same time, he sent messengers to meet Han Xin and Peng Yue again, promising them land and titles if they joined him in attacking Xiang Yu.

Battle of Gaixia 

Three months later, in 202 BCE, Liu Bang, Han Xin and Peng Yue attacked Xiang Yu from three directions. Xiang Yu's army ran low on supplies and were trapped in Gaixia (southeast of present-day Lingbi County, Anhui). Han Xin ordered his troops to sing Chu folk songs to create a false impression that Chu had fallen to Han forces. The Chu army's morale plummeted and many soldiers deserted.

Xiang Yu attempted to break out the siege and was left with only 28 men when he reached the northern bank of the Wu River (near present-day He County, Anhui). He made a last stand and managed to slay hundreds of Han officers and soldiers before he was eventually overwhelmed and decided to commit suicide by slitting his throat.

Aftermath
After Xiang Yu's death, the rest of the Kingdom of Chu surrendered to the Kingdom of Han, and China was unified under Han rule. Liu Bang granted Peng Yue, Ying Bu and Han Xin the titles of King of Liang, King of Huainan and King of Chu respectively. Months later, at the urging of his followers and vassals, Liu Bang declared himself emperor and established the Han dynasty as the ruling dynasty in China. The imperial capital was at Luoyang but later moved to Chang'an (present-day Xi'an, Shaanxi). Liu Bang made his wife Lü Zhi empress and his eldest son Liu Ying crown prince.

Although Liu Bang initially handsomely rewarded subjects who helped him become emperor, he gradually became suspicious of them and started to doubt their loyalties. Han Xin was demoted from King of Chu to Marquis of Huaiyin in late 202 BCE, and was subsequently arrested and executed by Empress Lü in 196 BCE for allegedly plotting a rebellion with Chen Xi. In the same year, Liu Bang believed rumours that Peng Yue was also involved in the plot, so he demoted Peng Yue to the status of a commoner. Peng Yue and his family members were subsequently executed by Empress Lü.

Cultural references
 In xiangqi (Chinese chess), the middle section of the board that separates the players' sides is called the "Chu river and Han border". The red and black sides represent Han and Chu respectively.
 The Beijing opera The Hegemon-King Bids His Concubine Farewell depicts the events of Xiang Yu's defeat at the Battle of Gaixia and his romance with Consort Yu. 
 Two well known music pieces for the pipa depict the Battle of Gaixia from the Han and Chu perspectives respectively – Shi Mian Mai Fu (Ambush from Ten Sides) and Ba Wang Xie Jia (The Hegemon-King Takes Off His Armour).
 Some chengyu (Chinese idioms) and proverbs originated from the events of the Chu–Han contention, such as
 "Breaking cauldrons and sinking boats", used to indicate one's determination to fight to the end, similar to burning one's boat and crossing the Rubicon. It originated from Xiang Yu's orders during the Battle of Julu when Chu forces launched a fierce attack on Qin forces.
 Feast at Swan Goose Gate, used figuratively to refer to an ostensibly joyous occasion which is actually a dangerous trap. It originated from an incident in 206 BCE when Xiang Yu invited Liu Bang to attend a feast while secretly planning to assassinate Liu Bang during the feast. The saying "Xiang Zhuang performs a sword dance with his attention directed towards the Duke of Pei" also originated from this event. It is used figuratively to refer to a person's action being a veiled attack on another person.
 "Pretending to repair the gallery roads while secretly passing through Chencang", used to refer to disguising one's action with a more obvious action. It originated from Han Xin's strategy to attack the Three Qins.
 "Fighting a battle with one's back facing a river", used to indicate one's determination to fight to the death. It originated from the Battle of Jingxing between Han and Zhao forces.
 "Ambush on ten sides", refers to a situation in which one is under siege. It originated from Han Xin's strategy to trap Xiang Yu during the Battle of Gaixia.
 "Surrounded by Chu songs", refers to one being surrounded by enemies on all sides. It originated from the Battle of Gaixia when the Han soldiers sang Chu folk songs to dampen the fighting spirit of the besieged Chu forces.

Film 
 The Great Conqueror's Concubine is a 1994 Hong Kong film directed by Wei Handao and Stephen Shin. Zhang Fengyi and Ray Lui starred as Liu Bang and Xiang Yu respectively.
 White Vengeance is a 2011 Chinese film directed by Daniel Lee. Leon Lai and Feng Shaofeng starred as Liu Bang and Xiang Yu respectively.
 The Last Supper is a 2012 Chinese film directed by Lu Chuan. Liu Ye and Daniel Wu played Liu Bang and Xiang Yu respectively.

Television 
 The Battlefield is a 1985 Hong Kong television series produced by TVB. Lawrence Ng and Shek Sau starred as Liu Bang and Xiang Yu respectively.
 The Story of Han Dynasty is a 2003 Chinese television series. Hu Jun and Xiao Rongsheng starred as Xiang Yu and Liu Bang respectively.
 The Conqueror's Story is a 2004 Hong Kong television series produced by TVB. Adam Cheng and Kwong Wah starred as Liu Bang and Xiang Yu respectively.
 In the tenth episode of Code Geass, the protagonist refers to the Battle of Wei River as inspiration for triggering a landslide during a battle.
 The Myth is a 2010 Chinese television series adapted from the 2005 film of the same title. A present-day photographer travels back in time and meets Liu Bang and Xiang Yu and becomes sworn brothers with them.
 King's War is a 2012 Chinese television series directed by Gao Xixi. Chen Daoming and Peter Ho starred as Liu Bang and Xiang Yu respectively.
 Chu Han Zhengxiong is a 2012 Chinese television series directed by Chen Jialin. Anthony Wong and Ren Chengwei played Liu Bang and Xiang Yu respectively.
 Beauties of the Emperor is a 2012 Chinese television series produced by Yu Zheng. It romanticises the life stories of Liu Bang and Xiang Yu (played by Luo Jin and Ming Dow respectively), with the focus on Liu Bang's wife Lü Zhi (played by Joe Chen), who loves and desires both of the two men.
 History of a Salaryman is a 2012 South Korean television series that aired on SBS. The 22-episode series, which satirises key historical figures of the Chu–Han Contention, is about an ordinary salaryman who gets involved in corporate espionage between rival pharmaceutical companies.

Video games 
 Rise of the Phoenix is a 1993 strategy video game produced by Japan's Koei. It was first released on SNES in 1994.
 Chǔ Hàn Zhēngbà: The War Between Chu & Han is a 1997 unlicensed turn-based strategy game for Famicom, developed and published by China's Fuzhou Waixing Computer Science & Technology (simply known as Waixing).
 Prince of Qin is a 2002 action RPG. The protagonist is the former Qin crown prince Fusu. He witnesses how the Qin dynasty becomes corrupted by Qin Er Shi and Zhao Gao, and decides to help Liu Bang and Xiang Yu overthrow the dynasty.

See also
Timeline of the Chu–Han Contention

References

 Sima Qian. Records of the Grand Historian.
 Ban Gu et al. Book of Han.
 Sima Guang. Zizhi Tongjian.

 
200s BC conflicts
Emperor Gaozu of Han
Wars of succession involving the states and peoples of Asia